Samuel Adam Adkins (born May 21, 1955) is a former professional American football player. He attended Cleveland High School in Reseda, California, and played college football at Wichita State University in Kansas.

(In 1984, the number was retired in honor of the Seahawks fans.) After hand surgery caused Adkins to miss the 1983 season, he retired.

He has since worked in broadcasting in the Seattle area, as the color commentator for the University of Washington football radio broadcasts and more extensively as a host and correspondent on the Seahawks postgame show.

He is married and has 4 children.

References

External links

1955 births
Living people
American football quarterbacks
Wichita State Shockers football players
Seattle Seahawks players
Players of American football from Los Angeles
People from Van Nuys, Los Angeles